Duals is a compilation album by the Irish rock band U2. It was released in April 2011 to u2.com subscribers.

Track listing

 "Where the Streets Have No Name" and "Amazing Grace" are studio mix of U2's performance at the Rose Bowl, Pasadena, 25 October 2009 and Soweto Gospel Choir's parts recorded in South Africa in sync with U2's performance.
 "The Wanderer" taken from the Zooropa album, 1993.
 "Falling at Your Feet" taken from The Million Dollar Hotel soundtrack, 2000.
 "Miss Sarajevo" taken from Passengers: Original Soundtracks 1, 1995.
 "Slow Dancing" was a B-side to "If God Will Send His Angels" single, 1997.
 "The Saints are Coming" taken from the U218 Singles compilation, 2006.
 "Sunday Bloody Sunday (Live from Auckland)" recorded at Mt. Mount Stadium on 25 November 2010.
 "One" taken from Mary J Blige The Breakthrough album, 2006.
 "When Love Comes To Town" taken from Rattle and Hum album, 1988.
 "Stuck in a Moment You Can't Get Out Of (Live at the Rock & Roll Hall of Fame)" recorded at the 25th Anniversary Rock & Roll Hall of Fame concert at Madison Square Garden, 30 October 2009.
 "The Ballad of Ronnie Drew" was released as a single in 2008.
 "I'm Not Your Baby" taken from The End of Violence soundtrack, 1997.
 "Stranded (Haiti Mon Amour) (Hybrid Mix)" was written for Hope for Haiti Now album (2010).
 "Drunk Chicken / America" taken from the remastered The Joshua Tree album, 2007.

References

U2 compilation albums
2011 compilation albums
Interscope Records compilation albums
Vocal duet albums
Albums produced by Brian Eno